Buffett Live – Tuesdays, Thursdays, Saturdays is a live album by American popular music singer-songwriter Jimmy Buffett. It was released on November 9, 1999.  The album's material was culled from several concerts during the Don't Stop That Carnival Tour (1998) and Beach House on the Moon Tour (1999). It was the first live album by Buffett since Feeding Frenzy was released in October 1990 and Mailboat Records' debut release.

Chart performance
The album reached No. 37 on the Billboard 200 album chart, No. 33 on the Independent Chart, and No. 8 on the Internet Chart. It was certified gold in October 2000.

Songs
The album features fan-favorites as well as new or obscure songs that never made it on a previous live release, such as "Fruitcakes", "Trying to Reason With Hurricane Season", "Brown Eyed Girl", "Tin Cup Chalice" and "Love and Luck".

While it is not part of the SYKBH and there has never been a studio release, "Southern Cross" makes its first official release.  It was well received when Buffett starting performing it during the Banana Wind Tour (1996) and became a concert staple from 1998 ever since.  The song continues to be played at nearly every show and remains a concert favorite, despite never having been recorded in the studio.

The album also features "Pencil Thin Mustache" and "Son of a Son of a Sailor", songs that haven't appeared on a live album for nearly fifteen years.

The remainder of the album features concert standards.  Although played at every show, three of the SYKBH failed to make the cut: "A Pirate Looks at Forty", "Why Don't We Get Drunk", and "Changes in Latitudes, Changes in Attitudes" (the latter also left off of Buffett's previous live release, Feeding Frenzy).

The track listings show that "Margaritaville" includes the infamous "lost verse".  During an East Hampton benefit concert, Buffett forgot that he had included the lost verse on his first live album You Had to Be There and apologized for making it appear that it was the lost verse's debut on this album.

The studio version of "Love and Luck" is available on Boats, Beaches, Bars and Ballads.

Track listings
"Fruitcakes" (Jimmy Buffett, Amy Lee) – 6:56
"Southern Cross" (Stephen Stills, Richard Curtis, & Michael Curtis) – 5:07
"Pencil Thin Mustache" (Jimmy Buffett) – 3:15
"Trying to Reason with Hurricane Season" (Jimmy Buffett) – 4:52
"Coconut Telegraph" (Jimmy Buffett) – 3:12
"Cheeseburger in Paradise" (Jimmy Buffett) – 3:06
"Come Monday" (Jimmy Buffett) – 3:43
"Son of a Son of a Sailor" (Jimmy Buffett) – 3:25
"Volcano" (Jimmy Buffett, Keith Sykes, Harry Dailey) – 3:36
"Brown Eyed Girl" (Van Morrison) – 5:40
"Tin Cup Chalice" (Jimmy Buffett) – 3:24
"Fins" (Jimmy Buffett, Barry Chance, Tom Corcoran, Deborah McColl) – 5:07
"One Particular Harbour" (Jimmy Buffett, Bobby Holcomb) – 6:10
"Margaritaville (Lost Verse Included)" (Jimmy Buffett) – 5:35
"Love and Luck" (Jocelyne Beroard, Jimmy Buffett, Jean-Claude Naimro) – 7:34

The album is approximately 68 minutes long.

Personnel
The Coral Reefer Band:
Jimmy Buffett – guitar, vocals
Michael Utley – keyboards
Greg "Fingers" Taylor – harmonica
Mac McAnally – guitars, vocals
Robert Greenidge – steel drums, percussion
Ralph MacDonald – percussion
Peter Mayer – guitar, vocals
Jim Mayer – bass, vocals
Roger Guth – drums
Amy Lee – saxophone
John Lovell – trumpet
T.C. Mitchell – saxophone
Tina Gullickson – vocals
Nadirah Shakoor – vocals
David Hewitt, Ryan Hewitt – recording engineers

Where each song was recorded live
BuffettWorld.com compiled a list of which songs were played at which show:
Fruitcakes – December 8, 1998 in Orlando, FL
Southern Cross – September 2, 1999 in Mansfield, MA
Pencil Thin Mustache – December 8, 1998 in Orlando, FL
Trying to Reason With Hurricane Season – December 4, 1998 in West Palm Beach, FL
Coconut Telegraph – Thursday August 19, 1999, in Cincinnati, OH
Cheeseburger in Paradise – Tuesday August 31, 1999, in Hartford, CT
Come Monday – March 4, 1999 in Orlando, FL
Son of a Son of a Sailor – June 12, 1999 in Manassas, VA
Volcano – Thursday August 19, 1999, in Cincinnati, OH
Brown Eyed Girl – Thursday July 15, 1999, in Noblesville, IN
Tin Cup Chalice – December 4, 1998 in West Palm Beach, FL
Fins – September 2, 1999 in Mansfield, MA
One Particular Harbour – December 4, 1998 in West Palm Beach, FL
Margaritaville (Lost Verse Included) – September 2, 1999 in Mansfield, MA
Love and Luck – February 20, 1999 in Nashville, TN

Notes

External links
Complete album art and liner notes at BuffettWorld.com

1999 live albums
Jimmy Buffett live albums
Albums produced by Michael Utley
Mailboat Records live albums